Conchou is a settlement in Guadeloupe, on the island of Grande-Terre.  It is located to the east of Le Moule; Guillocheau, Laureal, Guenette, and Portland are to its south.

References

Populated places in Guadeloupe